Maulana Hamid Ul Haq Haqqani is a Pakistani politician and Islamic scholar who served as a member of the 12th National Assembly of Pakistan from 16 November 2002 until 10 October 2007, when he resigned in protest. He became chief of the Jamiat Ulema-e-Islam (S) party after his father Sami ul Haq's assassination.

References

Living people
1968 births
Pakistani Islamic religious leaders
Pakistani MNAs 2002–2007
Jamiat Ulema-e-Islam (S) politicians
People from Nowshera District
Pakistani Sunni Muslim scholars of Islam
Darul Uloom Haqqania alumni
Deobandis
Academic staff of Darul Uloom Haqqania